Chase Building may refer to:

Chase Center
 Chase Center, sports arena in San Francisco
 Chase Center, Dallas, Texas, now the Comerica Bank Tower
 Chase Center, Seattle, Washington, now the Russell Investments Center
 Chase Center on the Riverfront, convention center in Wilmington, Delaware

Chase Tower
 Chase Tower (Amarillo), Texas
 Chase Tower (Chicago), Illinois
 Chase Tower (Columbus), Ohio
 Chase Tower (Dallas), Texas
 Chase Tower (Detroit), Michigan
 Chase Tower (El Paso), Texas
 Chase Tower (Englewood, Colorado)
 Chase Tower (Milwaukee), Wisconsin
 Chase Tower (Oklahoma City), Oklahoma
 Chase Tower (Phoenix), Arizona
 Chase Tower (Rochester), New York (now known as The Metropolitan)
 Chase Tower (Tucson), more commonly known as the Valley National Bank Building (Tucson, Arizona)

JPMorgan Chase Building
 JPMorgan Chase Building (Columbus), Ohio, known as the McCoy Building
 JPMorgan Chase Building (Houston), Texas
 JPMorgan Chase Building (New York City), New York, located at 270 Park Avenue
 JPMorgan Chase Building (San Francisco), California

JPMorgan Chase Tower
 JPMorgan Chase Tower (Houston), Texas

See also
 One Chase Manhattan Plaza
 Chase Manhattan Bank Building